The Friedrichshafen FF.71 was a German biplane floatplane produced by Flugzeugbau Friedrichshafen.

Design and development
The FF.71 was a four-seat biplane powered by a Benz Bz.IV straight-six engine. The prototype first flew in April 1919; despite the fact that the aircraft was intended for civilian buyers, it was painted in military rhombic camouflage. Initially, passengers were located in an open cockpit, but after an accident the aircraft was rebuilt with an enclosed passenger cabin.

In 1921, five more slightly modified aircraft were produced by LFG, receiving the designation FF.71a.

Specifications (FF.71a)

See also

References

Bibliography

1910s German civil aircraft
Floatplanes
Biplanes
Single-engined tractor aircraft
FF.71
Aircraft first flown in 1919